George Vivian McGann (17 January 1881 – 24 February 1947) was an Australian rules footballer who played with Carlton in the Victorian Football League (VFL).

Notes

External links 

George McGann's profile at Blueseum

1881 births
1947 deaths
Australian rules footballers from Victoria (Australia)
Carlton Football Club players